The Strickland Stakes is a Perth Racing Group 3 Thoroughbred horse race held under Weight for Age conditions, over a distance of 2000 metres at Belmont Park Racecourse, Perth, Western Australia.  Prizemoney is A$200,000.

History
The first event was held in 1901 as the WATC December Stakes. The race was moved to November and held in that month until 1998. In 2000 the race was run in January and in 2002 it was scheduled for April. Since 2011 the race has been held in June.

Distance
1901–1905 -  miles
 1906 -  miles
1907–1909 -  miles
1910–1972 -  miles
1973–2004 – 1800 metres
2005 – 2000 metres
2006–2010 – 1800 metres
2011 onwards - 2000 metres

Venue
The race was initially held in April at Ascot Racecourse. In 2011 when the race was moved to Belmont Park it was held in June.

1901–2004 - Ascot Racecourse
 2005 - Belmont Park
2006–2010 - Ascot Racecourse
2011 onwards - Belmont Park

Winners

 2022 - Prince Turbo
 2021 - Naughty By Nature
 2020 - Material Man
 2019 - Galaxy Star
 2018 - Material Man
 2017 - Scales of Justice
 2016 - Ihtsahymn
 2015 - Fuchsia Bandana
 2014 - Fancy Feet
 2013 - Kincaple
 2012 - Mr Moet
 2011 - God Has Spoken
 2010 - Marasco
 2009 - Marasco
 2008 - Action Pak
 2007 - Forest Frolic
 2006 - Exchequer
 2005 - True Steel
 2004 - Dedicated Miss
 2003 - Money Is Magic
 2002 - †Gwalia Girl / Finito
 2001 - Finito
 2000 - Iron Horse
 1999 - ‡race not held
 1998 - Summer Beau
 1997 - News Review
 1996 - Western Cossack
 1995 - Forge On
 1994 - Prime Again
 1993 - Wabasso
 1992 - Lincoln's Court
 1991 - Higginsville
 1990 - Acquired
 1989 - Timeless Action
 1988 - Perfect Answer
 1987 - Tabharry
 1986 - Track Jester
 1985 - Bungling
 1984 - My Serene
 1983 - Haulpak's Image
 1982 - Kiwi Bride
 1981 - Aldric
 1980 - Belle Talk
 1979 - Regimental Honour
 1978 - Velvet's Son
 1977 - Double East
 1976 - Unaware
 1975 - Ngawyni
 1974 - Haymaker
 1973 - Gilt Patten
 1972 - Millefleurs
 1971 - Chez Felix
 1970 - Surrender
 1969 - Chemech
 1968 - Jolly Aster
 1967 - Hilney
 1966 - Jolly Aster
 1965 - Royal Coral
 1964 - Rack And Ruin
 1963 - Bernguard
 1962 - Nicopolis
 1961 - First Orl
 1960 - Chestillion
 1959 - Kuantan
 1958 - On Guard
 1957 - Tribal Ring
 1956 - Lady Orator
 1955 - Asteroid
 1954 - Just Peter
 1953 - Moderniste
 1952 - Raconteur
 1951 - Chestnut Lady
 1950 - Jovial Lad
 1949 - Lady Lucia
 1948 - Victory Lad
 1947 - Lady Lucia
 1946 - Filipino
 1945 - Lord Treat
1942–44 - race not held
 1941 - Royal Standard
 1940 - Romanette
 1939 - True Flight
 1938 - Gay Prince
 1937 - First Consul
 1936 - Panto
 1935 - Yaringa
 1934 - Jolly Fair
 1933 - D'Artagnan
 1932 - Jolly Fair
 1931 - Peggy Poet
 1930 - Prince Paladin
 1929 - Runabout
 1928 - Good Hope
 1927 - Maple
 1926 - Maple
 1925 - Eracre
 1924 - Huette
 1923 - Lilypond
 1922 - Scorpius
 1921 - Easingwold
 1920 - Bobaris
 1919 - Mistico
 1918 - New Tipperary
 1917 - Post Laddie
 1916 - Mistico
 1915 - Jolly Beggar
 1914 - Pilbarra
 1913 - Lilyveil
 1912 - Maori Lad
 1911 - Florabel
 1910 - Thorina
 1909 - Annapolis
 1908 - Prophecy
 1907 - Bundorrie
 1906 - May King
 1905 - Nothos
 1904 - Fifeness
 1903 - Fifeness
 1902 - Honeydew
 1901 - Limber

† Dead heat
‡ Change in racing calendar

See also
 List of Australian Group races
 Group races

References

Horse races in Australia
Sport in Perth, Western Australia